History of the SAS may refer to the following:
 History of the Special Air Service
 History of the Second Avenue Subway

See also
 SAS (disambiguation)